Mala Prespa (Macedonian and) is a term used to denote a geographical area in eastern Albania, part of the wider region of Prespa. It is located on the western shore of Lake Prespa along the southeastern edge of Albania within the wider Korçë County and bordering the Pogradec and Devoll municipalities. The area is synonymous with Pustec Municipality.

It is officially recognised as a Macedonian minority zone. According to the 2011 Census, in Albania there are about 5,000 Macedonians, primarily in the Mala Prespa area, forming 97% of the population of the Pustec Municipality. This area also contains small numbers of Aromanians (Arvanito-Vlachs) and Bulgarians.

See also
Macedonians in Albania
Bulgarians in Albania
Gollobordë

References

Sources

Historical regions in Albania
Albanian ethnographic regions

de:Liqenas